Manor Hassan, (born August 22, 1979) is a retired Israeli football player.

He is of a Tunisian-Jewish descent.

External links

Hapoel Petach Tikva profile

1979 births
Living people
Israeli Jews
Israeli footballers
Hapoel Kiryat Ono F.C. players
Hapoel Petah Tikva F.C. players
Maccabi Haifa F.C. players
Beitar Jerusalem F.C. players
Bnei Yehuda Tel Aviv F.C. players
F.C. Ashdod players
Hakoah Maccabi Amidar Ramat Gan F.C. players
Hapoel Asi Gilboa F.C. players
Liga Leumit players
Israeli Premier League players
Israeli people of Tunisian-Jewish descent
People from Kiryat Ono
Association football midfielders